{|

{{Infobox ship career
|Hide header=
|Ship country=United States
|Ship flag=
|Ship name= USS Bigelow|Ship namesake=Elmer Charles Bigelow
|Ship ordered=30 July 1954
|Ship builder= Bath Iron Works
|Ship laid down=6 July 1955
|Ship launched=2 February 1957
|Ship acquired=1 November 1957
|Ship commissioned=8 November 1957
|Ship decommissioned=5 November 1982
|Ship in service=
|Ship out of service=
|Ship struck=1 June 1990
|Ship reinstated=
|Ship honours=
|Ship fate=Sunk as target, 2 April 2003
|Ship status=
|Ship notes=
|Ship motto=Concorditer Pugnamus
}}

The ship was named for Watertender Second Class Elmer Charles Bigelow (1920-1945), who was killed in action extinguishing a magazine fire while serving on board  during action against enemy Japanese forces off Corregidor in the Philippines on 14 February 1945. Bigelow was posthumously awarded the Medal of Honor.Bigelow was built by the Bath Iron Works Corporation at Bath in Maine. The ship was launched by Mrs. Verna B. Perry, mother of Elmer C. Bigelow.Bigelow was part of Combined Task Group CTG 136.1.1 tasked with blockading Cuba during the Cuban Missile Crisis. Bigelow received the Armed Forces Expeditionary Medal for participating from 24 October 1962 to 21 November 1962.Bigelow saw extensive service in the Vietnam War and also served as a NASA recovery ship for the Mercury and Gemini III programs.

While operating off Vietnam on 20 April 1967, an explosion in a gun mount injured six sailors, 1 killed.Bigelow served as a test platform for Phalanx CIWS in 1977. The mount was installed just aft of the aft radar gun director.All Hands Magazine January 2001 .

Glenn R. Brindel, commanding officer of  during the 1987 missile attack, was executive officer of Bigelow from 1978 to 1980.

FateBigelow'' decommissioned 5 November 1982.

She was sold for scrap to the Fore River Shipyard and Iron Works at Quincy, Massachusetts, on 11 December 1992. When the Fore River Shipyard went bankrupt she was resold to N. R. Acquisition Incorporated of New York City by the Massachusetts Bankruptcy Court. She was re-acquired by the Navy for disposition as a target ship, stricken 1 June 1990 and was "Disposed of in support of Fleet training exercise" (presumably sunk as a gunnery target) on or before 2 April 2003.

References

 

Forrest Sherman-class destroyers
Ships built in Bath, Maine
1957 ships
Ships sunk as targets
Cold War destroyers of the United States